Sortir du nucléaire (English "Nuclear phase-out") is a French federation of anti-nuclear groups.

Founded in 1997 as a result of the success of the struggle against the Superphénix, the organisation regularly campaigns against the use of nuclear power in France and in the world.

In September 2007, Sortir du nucléaire declined taking part in the talks with the French government, dubbed "Grenelle de l'environnement", in which major ecological organisations participated, because discussions about nuclear energy were forbidden by French president Nicolas Sarkozy.

March 2007 protests against the EPR 

On March 17, 2007 simultaneous protests, organised by Sortir du nucléaire, were staged in 5 French towns to protest construction of EPR plants; Rennes, Lyon, Toulouse, Lille, and Strasbourg.

Stop-EPR claimed that a total of over 60,000 people attended the rallies.  The news outlet Evening Echo reported that it was a way to get the issue in the eye of candidates in the April–May two-round presidential elections of 2007.  The largest crowd was in Rennes, close to Flamanville in Normandy, where preliminary construction on the EPR is underway.  Organisers claimed the number of protesters in Rennes was 30,000 to 40,000. Police estimated the crowd at 10,000.

See also

 Anti-nuclear movement
 Anti-nuclear movement in France
 Anti-nuclear movement in Germany
 Nuclear power in France
 Sortir du nucléaire (Canada)

References

External links
 French web site (in French and English) : www.sortirdunucleaire.org
 Safety of EPR nuclear reactors

Anti-nuclear organizations
Environmental organizations based in France
Nuclear energy in France
Nuclear safety in France
Anti-nuclear protests
International Campaign to Abolish Nuclear Weapons